Durão is a surname. Notable people with the surname include:

Joaquim Durão (1930–2015), Portuguese chess player
Nuno Durão (born 1962), Portuguese rugby union footballer and coach
Santa Rita Durão (1722–1784), orator and poet, creator of 'Indianism' in Brazil